Claudius Julius Ecclesius Dynamius (Latin: Claudius Iulius Ecclesius Dynamius) was a Roman senator during the late 5th-century who became consul in 488 and Urban prefect of Rome in 490 under Theodoric.

Ecclesius is known to have issued an edict, de fraudibus molendinariorum, which outlines the proper use of mills near Janiculum. He had public scales prepared in order to weigh the sacks of flour before and after the milling operation and fixes the millers' wages to three nummi per bushel.

References

Sources
Henri Alexandre Wallon, Histoire de l'esclavage dans l'antiquité, Volume 3 pp. 526–527

5th-century Romans
5th-century Roman consuls
Imperial Roman consuls
Urban prefects of Rome
Patricii
Julius Eclesius Dynamius
Claudius Eclesius Dynamius